Chakobsa is a Northwest Caucasian (NWC) language (possibly in the Circassian subgroup). According to John Colarusso it is also known as shikwoshir or the 'hunting language' and was originally a secret language used only by the princes and nobles, and is still used by their descendants. An informant of Colarusso's has asserted that Chakobsa is based on Circassian, encrypted by reordering words and changing phonemes, rather like Pig Latin but more complex. This assertion is as yet unconfirmed.

The 18th century adventurer Jacob Reineggs renders the name of the language as Sikowschir (note the -ow- instead of -wo-), calling it a "court-language", and records the following 18 word glossary: Paphle 'eye', Brugg 'head', Baetāŏ 'ear', Wũp 'rifle', Kaepe 'horse', Ptschakoaentsche 'camel', Ptschakokaff 'cow', Tkemeschae 'goat', Fogabbe 'sheep', Naeghune 'fire', Scheghs 'water', Uppe 'woman', Aelewsae 'child', Paschae 'money', Naekuschae 'bread', Schuwghae 'raincoat', Schufae 'fur' and Tewrettgllo 'to steal'.

According to the German orientalist and linguist Heinrich Julius Klaproth who travelled the Caucasus and Georgia between 1807 and 1808, the Circassians use secret languages on their raids, the two most common of which are called Schakobsché (rather than Sikowschir, as Klaproth expressly states) and Farschipsé. Of the first, which he describes as having no relation to the common Circassian language, he could not obtain any samples besides the ones given by Reineggs. The second, he says, is created by inserting ri or fé between each syllable, but from the nine examples he gives it is clear that it is more complicated than that, e.g. Circassian schah 'head' and tdl'e 'foot' which in "Farschipsé" become irisch'chari and tl'arukqari.

In his book Twelve Secrets of the Caucasus, first published in German in 1930, Lev Nussimbaum, writing under his pen name Essad Bey, also mentions a secret language called Chakobsa spoken by the inhabitants of the citadels, palaces and robbers' strongholds. He gives the following five words, stating that they were the only ones known to science: shapaka 'horse', amafa 'blood', ami 'water', asaz 'gun', and ashopshka 'coward'. (Note that the words for 'horse', 'water' and 'gun/rifle' differ from those given by Reineggs.)

In her book The Sabres of Paradise (1960), Lesley Blanch also makes mention of the "mysterious tongue" and "hunting language" Chakobsa.

Possibly influenced by Blanch's book, Frank Herbert named a fictional language in his 1965 novel Dune Chakobsa. However, the samples of this invented language which Herbert uses in the Dune series of novels are actually a mixture of the Romani language, Serbo-Croatian, and various Arabic terms.

References 

Northwest Caucasian languages
Cant languages